Ambarvalia was a Roman agricultural fertility rite 
held on 29 May in honor of Ceres and Dea Dia.

At these festivals they sacrificed a bull, a sow, and a sheep, which, before the sacrifice, were led in procession thrice around the fields; whence the feast is supposed to have taken its name, ambiō, "I go around," and arvum, field.  This sacrifice was called a suovetaurilia in Latin. These feasts were of two kinds, public and private. The private were solemnized by the masters of families, accompanied by their children and servants, in the villages and farms out of Rome. The public were celebrated in the boundaries of the city, and in which twelve fratres arvales walked at the head of a procession of the citizens, who had lands and vineyards at Rome. During the procession, prayers would be made to the goddess. The ambervale carmen was a prayer preferred on this occasion.

The name "Ambarvalia" appears to be predominantly an urban designation. Roman farmers' almanacs (menologia rustica) describe this only as segetes lustrantur ("crops are purified"). Scaliger, in his notes on Festus, maintains the ambarvalia to be the same as amburbium. Numerous other communities of the Italian peninsula enacted similar rites with different names.

Notes

References

External links

Ancient Roman festivals
May observances
Processions in ancient Rome
Festivals of Demeter
Ceres (mythology)